Quintez Cephus (born April 1, 1998) is an American football wide receiver for the Detroit Lions of the National Football League (NFL). He played college football at Wisconsin.

High school career
While playing high school football at Stratford Academy in Macon, Georgia, Cephus played running back, wide receiver and defense, earning a three-star recruiting grade.

College career
Cephus committed to Wisconsin on November 13, 2015. He also received offers from Miami, Georgia Tech, Vanderbilt and Georgia Southern. Cephus had also committed to Furman for basketball but decided to pursue football as a "business decision".

During his sophomore season, Cephus caught thirty passes and had his first career collegiate 100-yard receiving game, against Purdue. However, a broken leg, sustained against Indiana on November 4, sidelined Cephus for the rest of the season and required surgery.

After Cephus missed his junior season due to pending legal charges, the NCAA cleared him to play on August 23, 2019. After being expelled and reinstated by the school, Cephus said he returned to the football team because unlike others at the school, the football team never stopped supporting him. Cephus was noted for his ability to separate from defenders on the field of play during his senior season.

On January 6, 2020, Cephus declared for the 2020 NFL Draft. The move came after Cephus led the 2019 Badgers team in receptions, receiving yards and receiving touchdowns. He also participated in the 2020 NFL Scouting Combine, where he drew praise from other players at the Combine. He was drafted in the 5th round with the 166th pick by the Detroit Lions.

Professional career

Detroit Lions
Cephus was selected at in the fifth round with the 166th overall pick in the 2020 NFL draft by the Detroit Lions.  The Lions previously acquired the selection used on Cephus as a result of the trade that sent cornerback Darius Slay to the Philadelphia Eagles. On July 13, 2020, the Lions signed Cephus to a four-year contract. In Week 13, against the Chicago Bears, he scored his first professional touchdown on a 49-yard reception from quarterback Matthew Stafford.

On October 12, 2021, Cephus was placed on injured reserve with a shoulder injury.

On October 8, 2022, Cephus was once again placed on injured reserve.

NFL career statistics

Regular season

Personal life
In the early morning hours of April 22, 2018, Cephus engaged in sexual acts with two women who had flirted with him at a bar the night before. Cephus claimed the acts were consensual, but the women claimed that they were too drunk to give consent legally and that Cephus sexually assaulted them. Later that day, the Dane County Sheriff's Department searched Cephus' apartment, and in August, Cephus was suspended from the Badgers football team. Also in August, Cephus was formally charged with second- and third-degree counts of sexual assault of an intoxicated victim.

On October 9, Cephus sued the University of Wisconsin-Madison in federal court, stating that the university's Title IX investigation, occurring simultaneously with the Dane County investigation, deprived Cephus of due process relating to the Fifth Amendment. Also in October, Cephus entered into a not guilty plea, with a trial set for February, although that was later delayed to August. During spring of 2019, Cephus left the University of Wisconsin-Madison. It was later revealed that he was expelled by the school. In March 2019, Cephus dropped his lawsuit against the university.

On August 2, Cephus was acquitted on both counts. UW later re-admitted Cephus as a student before the 2019 fall semester, citing new information in their investigation.

References

External links
Detroit Lions bio
 Wisconsin Badgers bio

1998 births
Living people
Players of American football from Georgia (U.S. state)
Sportspeople from Macon, Georgia
American football wide receivers
Wisconsin Badgers football players
Detroit Lions players